Liu Rui (born March 13, 1982, in Harbin, Heilongjiang; sometimes known as Rui Lui) is a Chinese curler. He was the skip of the Chinese men's Olympic Curling Team at the 2014 Winter Olympics.

Liu played in his first World Curling Championships in 2008, playing third for Fengchun Wang. The team lost in the bronze medal game to Norway, settling for fourth place. After a slow start in the 2009 Ford World Men's Curling Championship, Liu switched to throw 4th stones while skip Fengchun Wang continued to call the game and throw 3rd stones. The team struggled, placing 9th.  The team represented China at the 2010 Winter Olympics, with Liu throwing last rocks and Wang continuing to skip. The team finished 8th with a 2–7 record.

After the Olympics, Liu took over skipping the team, leading China at the 2010 World Men's Curling Championship, placing 11th. He led China to a 6th place finish at the 2012 World Men's Curling Championship, the 2013 Ford World Men's Curling Championship and at the 2014 World Men's Curling Championship.

Personal life
He is married.

Teams

Liu was also part of the 2008 Continental Cup of Curling.

Grand Slam record

References

External links

1982 births
Living people
Chinese male curlers
Curlers at the 2010 Winter Olympics
Curlers at the 2014 Winter Olympics
Olympic curlers of China
Sportspeople from Harbin
Asian Games medalists in curling
Curlers at the 2007 Asian Winter Games
Curlers at the 2017 Asian Winter Games
Medalists at the 2007 Asian Winter Games
Medalists at the 2017 Asian Winter Games
Asian Games gold medalists for China
Asian Games bronze medalists for China
Pacific-Asian curling champions
Universiade medalists in curling
Universiade gold medalists for China
Universiade bronze medalists for China
Competitors at the 2009 Winter Universiade